The 1910–11 Swiss National Ice Hockey Championship was the third edition of the national ice hockey championship in Switzerland. Club des Patineurs Lausanne won the championship by defeating HC Bellerive Vevey in the final.

Championship

Semifinal 
 HC La Villa - Club des Patineurs Lausanne 2:3

Final 
 HC Bellerive Vevey - Club des Patineurs Lausanne 4:6

External links 
Swiss Ice Hockey Federation – All-time results

Nat
Swiss National Ice Hockey Championship seasons